Diabolical Conquest is the third studio album by the American death metal band Incantation. The album was released in 1998 on Relapse Records (US).  It is the only album to feature Daniel Corchado of The Chasm on vocals.

Diabolical Conquest webzine was named as a tribute to this album. Later, Kunal Choksi created the Diabolical Conquest Records.

Track listing

Credits
Daniel Corchado - Bass, guitars, vocals
John McEntee - Guitars
Kyle Severn - Drums
Bill Korecky - Producer, engineer
Dave Shirk & Bill Yurkiewicz - Mastering
Miran Kim - Cover artwork

References

Incantation (band) albums
1998 albums
Relapse Records albums